

Track listing

References

2006 albums
Techno albums by Australian artists